Kyiv International School (KIS) is a private international school located in Kyiv, Ukraine. Since 1992, it provides modern, robust learning experience serving the city's expatriate, diplomatic and business communities. The school is a member of Quality Schools International(QSI), a consortium of nonprofit college-preparatory schools following an American-style, international curriculum. It is a current member of CEESA, Central and Eastern European Schools Association.  The school operates with the approval of the Ukrainian government and offers a PreK - Grade 12 education in the English language, including a DP International Baccalaureate program as well as Advanced Placement courses. The school year is from August to June. 

The academic program uses a Performance-Based Mastery Learning approach to learning.  It is accredited by the Middle States Association of Colleges and Schools.It also has scholarship contracts, and follows an A, B, P, D, H grading.
The school offers instruction in five languages (French, German, Spanish, Russian, and Ukrainian). These courses are offered at a variety of levels from 6yo - 17yo within the context of the school’s language curriculum, and IB and AP programs for non-native and native speakers.

Facilities 
The school has a park-like campus with 24 hour security. The campus is purpose-built and includes learning center, sensory rooms, art, music and technology labs, an auditorium, an indoor swimming pool, indoor gyms with a climbing wall, fitness center, a cafeteria, a snack bar, modern playgrounds, soccer field, soccer mini pitch, an outdoor basketball court and an outdoor fitness area.

War in Ukraine
Due to the war in Ukraine Kyiv International School shifted to online learning. The school has a full program for 2022-23 academic year and operates on flexible modes.

Alumni
Graduate students receive acceptances to the world's top universities and colleges around the world, including Harvard University, Yale University, NYU,  Stanford University, and others.

References

External links 

Quality Schools International
International Baccalaureate schools in Ukraine
Schools in Kyiv
International schools in Ukraine
Educational institutions established in 1992
1992 establishments in Ukraine